Roman Aleksandrovich Khodunov (born 28 March 1997) is a Russian football player.

Club career
He made his debut in the Russian Professional Football League for FC SKA Rostov-on-Don on 19 July 2015 in a game against FC Astrakhan.

He made his debut for the FC Rostov main squad on 21 September 2016 in a Russian Cup game against FC Dynamo Moscow.

References

External links
 
 

1997 births
Living people
Russian footballers
Association football defenders
FC SKA Rostov-on-Don players
FC Rostov players
Russian Second League players